The Chatter Creek Guard Station is a Rustic style set of buildings in Wenatchee National Forest, in Leavenworth, Washington.  It was designed by the USDA Forest Service Architecture Group and built by the Civilian Conservation Corps.  The listing includes three contributing buildings:
 The Guard Station itself, 
 The Packer's Cabin, 
 The Barn, 

It is located just off the Icicle Gorge loop trail (which partly runs along Icicle Creek) in the Wenatchee Mountains.

Notes

References

Park buildings and structures on the National Register of Historic Places in Washington (state)
Buildings and structures in Chelan County, Washington
United States Forest Service ranger stations
Rustic architecture in Washington (state)
National Register of Historic Places in Chelan County, Washington